Boris Alekseyevich Prozorovsky (30 June 1891 in Saint Petersburg, Imperial Russia – 1937 in USSR) was a Russian composer and songwriter who specialized in the genre of Russian romance. Many of his best-known songs ("Rings" "Caravan", "Ships", among others) were originally performed by his protégé and one-time partner Tamara Tsereteli, who recorded some in 1927 (for the Muzpred/Muztrest record label), the year Prozorovsky's career reached its peak.

In 1929 the All-Russian Musicians Union's Conference declared the whole genre of Russian romance 'counter-revolutionary'. In 1930 Prozorovsky was arrested and spent three years in Gulag. After the release he continued to perform (now with pianist Daniil Olenin), but in 1937, at the height of the Great Purge, was arrested again and executed.

References

External links
"Караван" (lyrics by B. Timofeyev) performed by Dmitry Ryakhin. TV Kultura/Romantika Romansa with Lyubov Kazarnovskaya.

Russian composers
Russian male composers
Russian songwriters
1891 births
1937 deaths
Musicians from Saint Petersburg
20th-century Russian male musicians
Great Purge victims from Russia